Olaine is a city in Olaine Municipality in the Vidzeme region of Latvia. Olaine gained town rights in 1967. The name comes from the Saint Olai Church, built by the Misa river under Swedish rule in the 17th century. An old cemetery remains at this site. After 1868, a railway stop "Olai" was built on the Riga-Mitau line. After Latvian independence, in 1919 "Olai" was renamed to "Olaine", in line with the Latvianisation of topological names all over Latvia. The population in 2020 was 10,668.

The history of Olaine is closely connected to a nearby peat bog first taken into use in 1940. Thereafter, more production facilities were built, increasing numbers of workers needed accommodation, and the first dwellings were built in what is currently known as Olaine. Previously, Olaine was the name of a village just two kilometers away. This village now has the name of Jaunolaine (New Olaine).

Olaine is home of Olainfarm, the second largest pharmaceutical company in Latvia.

Twin towns — sister cities

Olaine is twinned with:

 Karlskoga, Sweden
 Nowa Sarzyna, Poland
 Ödeshög, Sweden
 Riihimäki, Finland
 Vadstena, Sweden

Notable people
Rustams Begovs - Latvian hockey player
Žaneta Jaunzeme-Grende - Latvian politician
Dmitrijs Miļkevičs - Latvian athlete
Jānis Kuzmins - World champion in slalom skateboarding

Literature
Vilīte, Valda: Olaines pagasts (2008)

See also
List of cities in Latvia

References

 
Towns in Latvia
Populated places established in 1967
Olaine Municipality
Vidzeme